Voodoo Island is a 1957 American horror film directed by Reginald Le Borg and written by Richard H. Landau. The film stars Boris Karloff, with a cast including Elisha Cook Jr., Beverly Tyler and  Rhodes Reason. It is set in the South Pacific and was filmed on Kauai, Hawaii back to back with Jungle Heat. Adam West appears in a small pre-"Batman" uncredited role (his first film role).

Voodoo Island was released theatrically in February 1957 by United Artists on a double bill with Pharaoh's Curse.

Premise
Property developers looking for the ideal South Pacific location for the new Paradise Carlton hotel, discover instead an island populated by carnivorous plants and zombies.

Cast
Boris Karloff as Phillip Knight
Beverly Tyler as Sarah Adams
Murvyn Vye as Barney Finch
Elisha Cook Jr. as Martin Schuyler (as Elisha Cook)
Rhodes Reason as Matthew Gunn
Jean Engstrom as Claire Winter
Friedrich von Ledebur as Native Chief (as Frederich Ledebur)
Glenn Dixon as Mitchell
Owen Cunningham as Howard Carlton
Herbert Patterson as Dr. Wilding
Jerry Frank as Vickers
Adam West as Weather Station #4 Radio Operator (uncredited)

Production

Voodoo Island was Adam West's first appearance in a film. Howard W. Koch and Aubrey Schenck's Bel-Air Productions signed Boris Karloff for a three-picture deal with Voodoo Island being the first film in the contract. The budget was estimated at around $150,000.

Release

Voodoo Island was released theatrically by United Artists on a double bill with Pharaoh's Curse in 1957. The film was later re-titled Silent Death for a very brief 1963 theatrical re-release, sharing the bill with The Black Sleep (1956), a film which is also known as Dr. Cadman's Secret.

Home media
On September 20, 2005, MGM (which owns United Artists) released Voodoo Island and The Four Skulls of Jonathan Drake together in a DVD double bill, marking the film's home media debut. The film was later released by Willette Acquisition Corp. on November 25, 2014.

Reception
Amongst reviews at the time of release, the reviewer for Variety wrote: "the thriller gimmicks come off with the desired impact under Reginald Le Borg's direction"; while The Motion Picture Exhibitor wrote that the film "may scare the kiddies and please the addicts of such entries", though concluded that "The cast is fair, the direction and production average, and the story of medium interest." Later, the film critic Leonard Maltin awarded the film two out of a possible four stars, calling it "boring"; and TV Guide gave it one out of five stars, calling it "a terrible film." On his website Fantastic Movie Musings and Ramblings, Dave Sindelar criticized the film's dialogue as "painfully self-conscious", LeBorg's direction, and Karloff's "clumsy" performance; although he also stated that the actor's presence helped the film. Sindelar also noted that the film managed to avoid the usual voodoo cliches, and enjoyed the killer plants, concluding "This is just one of those movies that calls for a little patience."

Dennis Schwartz from Ozus' World Movie Reviews awarded the film a grade C, calling it "An unconvincing and dull horror story that has a hokey payoff", and criticized the film's lack of a good story, shallow acting, and flatness that prevented it from providing enough thrills. Bruce Eder from Allmovie gave the film a mostly negative review, writing, "Reginald Le Borg's Voodoo Island is one of those movies that used to get shown on late-night local television – ostensibly a horror movie, it didn't have quite enough scares or good visual monsters to rate a place on "Chiller Theatre", but it was unsettling enough in some of its details to get attention."

References

External links
 
 
 
 
 

1957 films
1957 horror films
American black-and-white films
American supernatural horror films
Films about Voodoo
Films directed by Reginald Le Borg
Films scored by Les Baxter
Films set in Oceania
Films set on islands
United Artists films
Films shot in Hawaii
1950s English-language films
1950s American films